Korea National University of Arts is a national university in Seoul, South Korea. Korea National University of Arts was established in 1993 by the Ministry of Culture, Sports and Tourism of Korea as the only national university of arts with an aim to serve as a leading institution which cultivates artists. It has 26 departments in six schools: Schools of Music, Drama, Film, TV & Multimedia, Dance, Visual Arts, and Korean Traditional Arts.

History
Korea National University of Arts was established by law in 1993. In 1990, the Ministry of Culture and Tourism of Korea announced a 'Ten-Year Project for the Cultural Development,' and the foundation of a national arts institution was the crucial provision of this project. Until the early 1980s, in Korea, there was no specialized university that devoted its entire curriculum to artistic endeavors. Therefore, many budding artists who wanted to continue their artistic search through professional trainings went abroad. The announcement of the foundation of the national university of arts in 1993 was thus the revelation and manifestation of artistic prosperity in Korea. It is the only national university in Asia dedicated exclusively to preparing talented young artists for the professions of all artistic genres. Korea National University of Arts encompasses all disciplines of arts including music, dance, theatre, film, TV, animation, fine art, design, architecture, and Korean traditional arts.

The university consists of six independent but correlative schools: the School of Music, the School of Drama, the School of Film, TV & Multimedia, the School of Dance, the School of Visual Arts, and the School of Korean Traditional Arts. K-ARTS offers bachelor's and master's degree program while providing pre-school training program for promising young students. As of 2003, students enrolled in K-ARTS are about 2600, and more than 730 professors and lecturers are teaching in the newest studios and classrooms.

Academics

Programs
 Bachelor's Program
 Master's Program
 Artistic performance Training Programs (Prep School)
 Talented Artists Education System

Schools and departments
 School of Drama
 Department of Acting, Department of Directing, Department of Playwriting, Department of Stage Design, Department of Theatre Studies
 School of Dance
 Department of Dance Performance, Department of Choreography, Department of Dance Theory, Department of Art Management
 School of Music
 Department of Vocal Music, Department of Opera, Department of Lied and Oratorio, Department of Instrumental Music, Department of Composition, Department of Musical Technology, Department of Conducting, Department of Musicology
 School of Film, TV & Multimedia
 Department of Film Making, Department of Cinema Studies, Department of Multimedia, Department of Animation, Department of Broadcasting
 School of Visual Arts
 Department of Fine Art, Department of Design, Department of Architecture, Department of Art Theory
 School of Korean Traditional Arts
 Department Of Traditional Arts Theory, Department Of Traditional Music, Department Of Traditional Dance, Department of Traditional Folk Theatrics
 Interschool Division
 Arts Management, Creation of Narratives, Musicals

Campus
Korea National University of Arts is made up of two Seoul-based campuses: the Seokgwan Campus and the Seocho Campus.

Achievements

For the first time for an Asian musician, Sunwook Kim, won one of the world's three top piano competitions, the Leeds International Piano Competition, in June 2006. After signing a contract with Askonas Holt, he performed with London Philharmonic.

Shin Hyeonsu won the Long-Thibaud International Competition for Violin in November 2008. She also received two special awards, including the Recital and Orchestra Award.

The three top prizes at the NY International Ballet Competition were awarded to K-Arts graduates. The New York Times reported "A contest for the World, led by South Koreans". The first prize winner, Ha Eunji, joined the Finnish National Ballet as the principal dancer.

The Department of Architecture joined RIBA, the Royal Institute of British Architects. For the first time for a university in a non-English speaking region, K-Arts received international certification from RIBA.

The Korean film, The Chaser, was screened out of competition in the Cannes Film Festival, and it received the Best Script Award in the PIFF as well as other awards from The Grand Bell Awards, The Blue Dragon Film Awards, The Baeksang Arts Awards, and others. The film's director, Na Hong-jin, the director of photography, Lee Seong-jae and the cinematographer, Lee Min-bok, are all K-Arts graduates.

Notable alumni
 Ahn Eun-jin
Anupam Tripathi
 Byun Yo-han
 Choi Han-bit
 Choi Ye-bin
 Choi Sung-eun
 Choo Young-woo
 Han Ji-hyun
 Han Ye-ri
 Im Jae-hyuk
 Jang Dong-gun
 Jeong Jae-eun
 Jin Kyung
 Jinsang Lee
 Jin Seon-kyu
 Jung So-min
 Jung Young-jae
 Kim Ae-ran
 Kim Dong-wook
 Kim Go-eun
 Kim Jung-hyun
 Kim Sung-cheol
 Kim Sun-wook
 EunWon Lee
 Lee Hee-joon
 Lee Hyun-wook
 Lee Je-hoon
 Lee Jeong-beom
 Lee Joon
 Lee Sang-yi (actor) 
 Lee So-yeon
 Lee Sun-kyun
 Lee Yong-woo
 Lee Yoo-young
 Lim Ji-yeon
 Moon Jeong-hee
 Na Hong-jin
 Nam Yeon-woo
 Oh Hye-soo
 Oh Man-seok
 Park Hae-joon
 Park Ji-soo
 Park Jong-min
 Park Sae-eun
 Park So-dam
 Park Ju-hyun
 Park Jung-min
 Seo Eun-ah
 Seo Eun-soo
 Shin Hyun-bin
 Shin Hyun-su
 Stephanie Kim
 Kim Jun-myeon
 Mikyung Sung
 Kim Tae-goon
 Wang Ji-won
Won Ji-an
 Yang Se-jong
 Yeol Eum Son
 Yoo Sun
 Yoon Hee-seok
 Yoon Park
 Yunchan Lim
 Yoon So-young
 Shin Dong-ho
 Jo Doo-hyun

See also
 Korean art
 List of national universities in South Korea
 List of universities and colleges in South Korea
 Education in Korea

References
 Korea National University of Arts English Website

External links
Official school website, in English
Official school website, in Korean

 
Educational institutions established in 1993
Universities and colleges in Seoul
Art schools in South Korea
1993 establishments in South Korea
Music schools in South Korea
Film schools in South Korea
National universities and colleges in South Korea
Seongbuk District